Katy Gardner (born 1964) is a British author and anthropologist, best known for her novel Losing Gemma, which was turned into a two-part miniseries for ITV1 in 2006.

Gardner is a graduate of Cambridge University who undertook her doctoral research at the London School of Economics. As well as being the author of four novels, she was for some years a Professor of Social Anthropology at Sussex University.

In 2013, Gardner returned to the LSE as a Professor of Anthropology.

Bibliography 
Songs at the River's Edge: Stories from a Bangladeshi Village (1991)
Global Migrants, Local Lives: Travel and Transformation in Rural Bangladesh (2001)
Losing Gemma (2002)
Age, narrative and migration: the life course and life histories of Bengali elders in London (2002)
The Mermaid's Purse (2003)
Keefer's Rules (2006)
Hidden (2006)
Faker (2008)
Discordant Development: Global Capitalism and the Struggle for Connection in Bangladesh (2012)

References

External links
Katy Gardner at Sussex University's website
Information about Katy Gardner's books

1964 births
Living people
Academics of the University of Sussex
British anthropologists
British writers
Academics of the London School of Economics
Alumni of the University of Cambridge
Alumni of the London School of Economics